Lernaeopodidae is a family of parasitic copepods. The females are typically large and fleshy, and attach to the host permanently using a plug made of chitin called the bulla. The males cling on to the females using their antennae. They parasitize both marine and freshwater fish. Some lernaeopodids, including Clavella and Salmincola, can have negative impacts on fish in aquaculture.

Genera
The family contains the following genera:

 Acespadia Leigh-Sharpe, 1933
 Achtheres Nordmann, 1832
 Alella Leigh-Sharpe, 1925
 Anaclavella Heegaard, 1940
 Basanistes Nordmann, 1832
 Brachiella Cuvier, 1830
 Brianella Wilson C.B., 1915
 Brianellinae Wilson C.B., 1915
 Cauloxenus Cope, 1872
 Charopinus Krøyer, 1863
 Clavella Oken, 1815
 Clavellinae Wilson C.B., 1915
 Clavellisa Wilson C.B., 1915
 Clavellistes Shiino, 1963
 Clavellodes Wilson C.B., 1915
 Clavellomimus Kabata, 1969
 Clavellopsis Wilson C.B., 1915
 Clavellotis Castro-Romero & Baeza-Kuroki, 1984
 Coregonicola Markevich, 1936
 Cryptova Kabata, 1992
 Dendrapta Kabata, 1964
 Eubrachiella Wilson C.B., 1915
 Euclavellisa Heegaard, 1940
 Kabatahoia Kazachenko, 2001
 Kabatazus Özdikmen, 2008
 Lernaeopoda Blainville, 1822
 Lernaeopodina Wilson C.B., 1915
 Lernaeopodinae Wilson C.B., 1915
 Margolisius Benz, Kabata & Bullard, 2000
 Mixtio Kabata, 1986
 Naobranchia Hesse, 1863
 Nectobrachia Fraser, 1920
 Neoalbionella Özdikmen, 2008
 Nudiclavella Ho, 1975
 Ommatokoita Leigh-Sharpe, 1926
 Parabrachiella Wilson C.B., 1915
 Proclavellodes Kabata, 1967
 Pseudocharopinoides Castro-Romero & Baeza-Kuroki, 1987
 Pseudocharopinus Kabata, 1964
 Pseudolernaeopoda Castro-Romero & Baeza-Kuroki, 1986
 Pseudolernaeopodina Hogans, 1988
 Pseudomixtio Kabata, 1990
 Pseudotracheliastes Markevich, 1956
 Salmincola Wilson C.B., 1915
 Schistobrachia Kabata, 1964
 Sparidicola Kabata & Tareen, 1987
 Thysanote Krøyer, 1863
 Tracheliastes Nordmann, 1832
 Tracheliastinae Wilson C.B., 1915
 Vanbenedenia Malm, 1861

References

Siphonostomatoida
Crustacean families
Taxa named by Henri Milne-Edwards